Oropogon is a genus of lichenised ascomycetes in the large family Parmeliaceae. It is a genus of roughly 40 currently accepted species. It was previously included in the family Alectoriaceae, but this group has since been subsumed into the Parmeliaceae.

All members of the genus have a fruticose growth form. The most obvious synapomorphic character which separates Oropogon from the rest of the family is the large brown, muriform ascospores (i.e. with transverse and longitudinal walls) that occur singly in each ascus.

Species
Oropogon aliphaticus 
Oropogon americanus 
Oropogon asiaticus 
Oropogon atranorinus 
Oropogon barbaticus 
Oropogon bicolor 
Oropogon bolivianus 
Oropogon byssaceus 
Oropogon caespitosus 
Oropogon cinereus 
Oropogon colibor 
Oropogon diffractaicus 
Oropogon evernicus 
Oropogon fissuratus 
Oropogon formosanus 
Oropogon granulosus 
Oropogon halei 
Oropogon herzogii 
Oropogon imperforatus 
Oropogon lateralis 
Oropogon lopezii 
Oropogon lorobic 
Oropogon loxensis 
Oropogon macilentus 
Oropogon maurus 
Oropogon mexicanus 
Oropogon orientalis 
Oropogon parietinus 
Oropogon pendulus 
Oropogon protocetraricus 
Oropogon pseudoloxensis 
Oropogon salazinicus 
Oropogon satoanus 
Oropogon secalonicus 
Oropogon sperlingii 
Oropogon striatulus 
Oropogon tanakae 
Oropogon venezuelensis 
Oropogon yunnanensis

References

Parmeliaceae
Lichen genera
Lecanorales genera
Taxa described in 1861
Taxa named by Theodor Magnus Fries